is a passenger railway station located in the city of Chōfu, Tokyo, Japan, operated by the private railway operator Keio Corporation.

Lines 
Tsutsujigaoka Station is served by the Keio Line, and is located 12.5 kilometers from the starting point of the line at Shinjuku Station.

Station layout 
This station consists of two island platforms serving four tracks, with an elevated station building located above the tracks and platforms.

Platforms

History
It was renamed to its present name in 1957.

Passenger statistics
In fiscal 2019, the station was used by an average of 45,169 passengers daily. 

The passenger figures (boarding passengers only) for previous years are as shown below.

Surrounding area
 Jindai Post Office

See also
 List of railway stations in Japan

References

External links

 Keio Railway Station Information 

Keio Line
Stations of Keio Corporation
Railway stations in Tokyo
Railway stations in Japan opened in 1913
Chōfu, Tokyo